Alexander Laing Reid (9 February 1897 – 3 November 1969) was a Scottish footballer who played as an outside right for teams including Airdrieonians, Third Lanark, Aberdeen and Preston North End.

He was Aberdeen's record signing when he joined in 1925, the club having money to spend from the recent sale of Alex Jackson.

At representative level, Reid took part in the Home Scots v Anglo-Scots trial and was subsequently selected as a reserve for the Scotland v England international fixture, and was selected for the Glasgow FA's annual challenge match against Sheffield, all taking place in 1922 while he was playing for Third Lanark, but this never led to a full cap. He also joined the club's tour of South America in the summer of 1923.

References

1897 births
1969 deaths
Scottish footballers
Footballers from West Lothian
People from Bathgate
Association football outside forwards
Ashfield F.C. players
Airdrieonians F.C. (1878) players
Third Lanark A.C. players
Motherwell F.C. players
Aberdeen F.C. players
Preston North End F.C. players
Blackpool F.C. players
Chorley F.C. players
Darwen F.C. players
Scottish Junior Football Association players
Scottish Football League players
English Football League players